Dichlorophenols (DCPs) are any of several chemical compounds which are derivatives of phenol containing two chlorine atoms.  There are six isomers:
 2,3-Dichlorophenol
 2,4-Dichlorophenol
 2,5-Dichlorophenol
 2,6-Dichlorophenol 
 3,4-Dichlorophenol
 3,5-Dichlorophenol

Dichlorophenols are used as intermediates in the manufacture of more complex chemical compounds, including the common herbicide 2,4-dichlorophenoxyacetic acid (2,4-D).

See also
 Chlorophenol
 Trichlorophenol
 Pentachlorophenol

References

Chloroarenes
Phenols